National Highway 328, commonly referred to as NH 328 is a national highway in India. It is a secondary route of National Highway 28.  NH-328 runs in the state of Uttar Pradesh in India.

Route 
NH328 connects Basti, Mehdawal, Karmaini, Campierganj and Partawal(Kaptanganj) in the state of Uttar Pradesh.

Junctions  
 
  Terminal near Basti.
  near Mehdawal
  near Campierganj
  Terminal near Partawal(Kaptanganj).

See also 
 List of National Highways in India
 List of National Highways in India by state

References

External links 

 NH 328 on OpenStreetMap

National highways in India
National Highways in Uttar Pradesh